George Rae may refer to:

George Rae (actor) (born 1978), Scottish actor
 George Rae (architect) (1901after 1935), Australian architect
 George Rae (banker) (1817–1902), British banker, stockbroker and patron of Dante Gabriel Rossetti
George Rae (footballer), Scottish footballer
 George Rae (physician), British doctor and television presenter